Filetab is a decision table-based computer programming language widely used in business in the 1960s and 1970s.

History
Filetab has a long history, originally designed in the late 1960s and descended from the DETAB programming. Filetab was developed by the National Computing Centre (NCC) and originally used on ICL operating systems such as GEORGE 2/3 and VME, but ported to a large number of others.

The original architect of Filetab was Tom Barnard, who developed the program (LITA - LIst and TAbulate) for Morgan Crucible when employed by them as a programmer on an ICL 1902 from 1965–1968. Its purpose was to produce simple ad hoc reports similar to those created with a plugboard on a punched card tabulator, bypassing the necessity to write an assembly language program in PLAN. It required only a few cards to specify the input and output formats, headings, sequencing and totalling. LITA could not be described as a programming language as it only required run-time parameters indicating field types and locations in records and no compilation. In those days there was no concern by Morgan's regarding ownership or copyright when Barnard left to further develop the software as Filetab.

In 2009 facing financial difficulty NCC sold the rights to Filetab to a newly formed company "NCC Filetab Limited". The Managing Director of NCC Filetab Limited was also the Managing Director of NCC at this time,  although NCC Filetab Limited, despite the similarity of its name, was not owned by NCC. In 2010 NCC was declared insolvent and was liquidated.

Variants
Versions produced include:

 TABN for ICL 1900 series mainframes
 TAB-360 for IBM System/360 (also known as DETAB-360)
 UNITAB for UNIVAC
 HTAB for Honeywell
 TAB-11 for RSTS/E on PDP-11
 FTL6 for ICT 1900 series
 DTPL for ICT 1900 series – slightly different from FTL6
 RPL-11 for RT-11, RSTS/E, RSX-11 on PDP-11
 RPL-3 for IBM System/3
 Filetab-D for x86 and PDP-11
 FPL - Fast programming Language. Written in 8086 Assembler for IBM PCs and compatibles. (Released in 1986). Written by Kevin Powis.
 Rapid-Expert and expertGenius extended syntax for Microsoft Windows, Unix and OpenVMS
 RapidGen compiler and FILETAB legacy converters for Windows, Unix and OpenVMS

A Linux version was produced in 2001, which although free to use was not Open Source and licensed under the GPL, drawing some criticism from the Open Source Software Community.

References

External links
 RapidGen Software For Windows, Unix and OpenVMS versions of Filetab development tools
 Filetab Developers Guide, 2001, NCC

ICL programming languages